Kalochori-Panteichi is a halt, in Boeotia, Greece. The station serves the village of Kalochori-Panteichi. It is owned by OSE, but service are provided by Hellenic Train, through the Athens Suburban Railway from Athens to Chalcis.

History
The station opened on 6 April 2005 as an unstaffed intermediate station on the Athens to Chalcis service of the Athens Suburban Railway. That same year TrainOSE was created as a brand within OSE to concentrate on rail services and passenger interface. In 2008, all Athens Suburban Railway services were transferred from OSE to TrainOSE.

Facilities
The station is an unstaffed halt, with few facilities, aside from two small shelters with seating. There is no cafe or shop on-site. At platform level, there are sheltered seating but no Dot-matrix display departure, arrival screens or public address (PA) systems; however, timetable poster boards on both platforms are available. The Motorway 1 passes west of the station; however, there are no car parking facilities or drop-off capability.

Services

Since 15 May 2022, the following weekday services call at this station:

Station layout

See also
Railway stations in Greece
Hellenic Railways Organization
Hellenic Train
Proastiakos

References

Transport in Boeotia
Railway stations in Central Greece
Railway stations opened in 2005
2005 establishments in Greece